Oscar Lange is the name of:

Oscar V. Lange, US photographer
Oskar R. Lange, Polish economist and diplomat